The Republic of Vietnam competed as Vietnam at the 1972 Summer Olympics in Munich, West Germany. Two competitors took part in one event in one sport.

Shooting

Two shooters represented Vietnam in 1972.

50 m pistol
 Hồ Minh Thu - 49th Place
 Hương Hoàng Thi - 56th Place

References

External links
Official Olympic Reports

Nations at the 1972 Summer Olympics
1972
1972 in Vietnam